Thanh Thủy is a rural district of Phú Thọ province in the Northeast region of Vietnam. As of 2003, the district had a population of 76,330. The district covers an area of 124 km². The district capital lies at Thanh Thủy.

Administrative divisions
The district consists of the district capital, Thanh Thủy, and 14 communes: Xuân Lộc, Thạch Đồng, Tân Phương, Bảo Yên, Đoan Hạ, Sơn Thủy, Hoàng Xá, Trung Thịnh, Đồng Luận, Trung Nghĩa, Phượng Mao, Yến Mao, Tu Vũ and Đào Xá.

References

Districts of Phú Thọ province